Camlock or cam lock may refer to:

Camlock (climbing), designed to wedge between rock surfaces
Camlock (electrical), often used in temporary electrical power production and distribution in North America
Camlock (fluid fitting), a type of hose coupling
Cam lock (latch)
 Cam fastener, a two-part fastener often used in flat-pack furniture that incorporates a cam lock latch